The Champlain Bridge crosses the Ottawa River about  west of Parliament Hill, joining the communities of Ottawa, Ontario and Gatineau, Quebec. It is the westernmost link between the two cities.

It was originally built between 1924 and 1928 by the Federal District Commission, the predecessor to the National Capital Commission (NCC), and the NCC continues to maintain the bridge. The bridge consists of 4 spans and crosses Riopelle, Cunningham and Bate Islands in the Ottawa River.

On the Ontario side, it is a continuation of Island Park Drive and is also connected to the Sir John A. Macdonald Parkway. It connects to Aylmer Road on the Quebec side.

A third reversible lane was added when the bridge was rebuilt in 2002, which is a high-occupancy vehicle lane used for crossings in the direction of peak traffic.

The bridge was named after Samuel de Champlain who is associated with the portage around the rapids in this section of the river. The short access roadway on the Aylmer side of the bridge is called Place Samuel de Champlain.

A  stretch of the Ottawa River that the Champlain Bridge passes over was not charted by the Canadian Hydrographic Service.

See also 
List of bridges in Ottawa
List of bridges in Canada
List of crossings of the Ottawa River

Reference

External links

Transport Canada

Bridges in Ottawa
Bridges in Gatineau
Bridges completed in 1928
Bridges over the Ottawa River
Road bridges in Ontario
Road bridges in Quebec
Roads with a reversible lane
1928 establishments in Canada
National Capital Commission
1928 establishments in Ontario
1928 establishments in Quebec